Eldon Industries, Inc. was a toy company located in Hawthorne, California (the hometown of the Mattel toy company), that also in its heyday operated factories in Canada, Spain, England, Japan, and the Netherlands. The company is best known for items and brands that repackaged Japanese toys and distributed them worldwide - an example is the Billy Blastoff astronaut toy produced by Tomy.  Slot cars and plastic toys were common Eldon offerings.

Eldon's slogan was "Just for the fun of it." which could be heard in both TV and radio advertisement, as well as in print ads.

Memorable Toys
 Poweride Electric Riding Toys
 1/32 Scale Slot Cars and Sets
 1/24 Scale Slot Cars and Sets
 HO Scale Slot Cars and Sets
 Billy Blastoff and Robbie Robot
 Power Blocks Construction Sets
 Touch Command (Air Pressure Actuated) Remote controlled Cars, Submarines and Amphibian vehicle
 Steer 'N Score Driving Test
 Slick Strip "N" gauge cars and track
 Collect-A-Car Raceway and cars
 Match Kit Sports Cars, Military Vehicles, Military Airplanes and World War 1 planes
 Pink Panther Magazine Series 1/25 Model Kit
 Outhouse Magazine Series 1/25 Model Kit
 Milk Truck Magazine Series 1/25 Model Kit
 Sand Draggin Magazine Series 1/25 Model Kit
 Bathtub Magazine Series 1/25 Model Kit
 Invader Magazine Series 1/25 Model Kit
 Remote Control Chevrolet Corvette Stingray
 Computer Truck
 Design-A-Matic Woodburning Set
 Bowl-A-Matic Bowling Game
 Cap'n Paddles the dunking duck
 Missile firing F-100 Super Sabre
 Squirt guns
 Pipsqueaks action figures
 3-D Scenics models

Toy companies of the United States
Defunct toy manufacturers
Companies based in Los Angeles County, California
Hawthorne, California
Defunct manufacturing companies based in California